Royal Prussian Jagdstaffel 37, commonly abbreviated to Jasta 37, was a "hunting group" (i.e., fighter squadron) of the Luftstreitkräfte, the air arm of the Imperial German Army during World War I. The unit would score over 70 aerial victories during the war, including 13 observation balloons downed. The squadron's victories came at the expense of seven killed in action, two killed in flying accidents, three wounded in action, and three taken prisoner of war.

History
Jasta 37 was founded on 10 January 1917 at Fliegerersatz-Abteilung (Replacement Detachment) 8, Graudenz. It flew its first combat missions on 23 March, and scored its first victory on 13 April 1917. It would serve until war's end, when the Luftstreitkräfte was disbanded.

Commanding officers (Staffelführer)
 Kurt Grasshoff : circa 10 March 1917
 Ernst Udet: 7 November 1917
 Gustav Gobert: 24 March 1918
 Georg Meyer: 5 April 1918

Duty stations
 Möntingen: 10 March 1917
 Wynghene: 18 July 1917
 With 6 Armee: 5 August 1917
 Wynghene: October 1917
 Le Cateau: 15 March 1918
 St. Christ: Unknown date

Notable personnel
Wilhelm Bittrich
 Kurt Grasshoff
Heinrich Henkel
 Georg Mayer
 Ernst Udet
 Hans Waldhausen

Operations
Jasta 37 began operations in the Armee-Abteilung A sector on or before 10 March 1917. It moved to support 4 Armee on 18 July 1917. It moved to support 6 Armee on 5 August, returning to serve with 4 Armee in October. On 15 March 1918, the squadron moved to support 2 Armee.

References

Bibliography
 

37
Military units and formations established in 1917
1917 establishments in Germany
Military units and formations disestablished in 1918